Every Family Has A Secret is an Australian television documentary reality genealogy series, presented by Noni Hazlehurst. It is an observational documentary series which follows Australians seeking out the hidden secrets within their families which can be a life changing journey. In each episode two Australians, some of whom are well-known, learn about hidden chapters in their family tree.

Episodes

Season One (2019)

Season Two (2020)

References

External links
 Official website
 

2010s Australian documentary television series
2019 Australian television series debuts
Television series about family history
Special Broadcasting Service original programming
English-language television shows
2020s Australian documentary television series